Nərimanlı may refer to:
 Nərimanlı, Goranboy, Azerbaijan
 Nərimanlı, Shamkir, Azerbaijan
 Shatvan, formerly Nərimanlı, Gegharkunik Province, Armenia